Edgar Pineda Zeta (born 17 August 1997) is a Guatemalan Olympic weightlifter. He represented his country at the 2016 Summer Olympics.

References

External links 
 

1997 births
Living people
Guatemalan male weightlifters
Weightlifters at the 2016 Summer Olympics
Olympic weightlifters of Guatemala
Pan American Games medalists in weightlifting
Pan American Games silver medalists for Guatemala
Weightlifters at the 2019 Pan American Games
Medalists at the 2019 Pan American Games
Pan American Weightlifting Championships medalists
21st-century Guatemalan people